Harry Ernest Pattee (January 17, 1882 – July 17, 1971) was a professional baseball player who played second base for the 1908 Brooklyn Superbas.  He went to college at Brown University.

External links

1882 births
1971 deaths
Major League Baseball second basemen
Brooklyn Superbas players
Jersey City Skeeters players
Harrisburg Senators players
Rochester Bronchos players
Buffalo Bisons (minor league) players
Brown Bears baseball coaches
Baseball players from Boston
Plattsburgh (baseball) players